Socket 47x may refer to:

 Socket 478 (mPGA478, mPGA478B)
 Socket 479 (mPGA479M)
 Socket M (mPGA478MT)
 Socket P (mPGA478MN)